Rangpur Government College is an educational institution in Rangpur, Bangladesh. It was established on July 25, 1963. It is situated in Radaballav, within one kilometer from the town center.

History

In the year 1963, when it is turned into a government institution, number of student seats in Carmichael College became limited. In this situation, the absence of a college proving education to the extended number of students is intensely felt. In this circumstance some philanthropists including Fulle Hossain, the then District Commissioner O.M. Carnie, Assistant District Commissioner Abdus Sattar, District Education Officer Tahemidur Rahman, advocate Abul Khan, Amin Hossain, Abul Salek, Moin Uddin Sarker et. el. come forward to set up a college. Some rich people also gave necessary land to establish the college immediately. Finally on July 25, 1963, it got established. Since its establishment till 1992, it was under the supervision of Rajshahi University. It becomes a government college on November 1, 1984. It came under Bangladesh National University in 1993.

Campus

The college with its four academic buildings stands on 5.26 acre of land. It has two hostels for students. The female hostel can accommodate 100 students while the male host, namely Shahid Moslem Uddin Chattrabas is obsolete now. Some extra-curriculum activities based students organizations are also functioning in the campus. These are, voluntary blood donation related club Badhon, Bangladesh National cadet Corps (BNCC), Red Crescent Society etc.

Academics
Currently about 16000 HSC, Honors, and Masters level students are enrolled in the college in regular and irregular session, 2400 of them being HSC students. Number of teachers is 62. There are three main branches of study in this college: science, arts and commerce. Fourteen Honors level subjects offered in this college are given below:
 Physics
 Chemistry
 Mathematics
 Zoology
 Botany
 Bengali
 English
 Political Science
 History
 Economics
 Islamic History
 Philosophy
 Accounting
 Management

Total number of class rooms is 23.

References

External links 

 

Colleges affiliated to National University, Bangladesh
Rangpur Government College
Colleges in Rangpur District
Universities and colleges in Rangpur District
Educational institutions established in 1963
1963 establishments in East Pakistan
Education in Rangpur, Bangladesh